The following table is a list of films produced in Denmark or in the Danish language during the 1950s. For an alphabetical list of all Danish films currently on Wikipedia see :Category:Danish films. For Danish films from other decades see the Cinema of Denmark box above.

External links
 Danish film at the Internet Movie Database

1950s
Films
Lists of 1950s films

da:Danske film
nl:Lijst van Deense films